On 1 January 2023, a bombing occurred at a checkpoint outside the military airport in Kabul, located about 200 metres from the civilian Kabul International Airport in Afghanistan. It killed and injured several people. The following day, on 2 January, the Islamic State claimed responsibility for the bombing on Telegram, stating to have killed 20 people and injured 30. The Taliban-run ministry of interior denied those numbers, saying it would be releasing an official toll.

See also 
 2021 Kabul airport attack
 List of terrorist attacks in Kabul
 List of terrorist incidents in 2023

References 

2023 in Kabul
2023 murders in Afghanistan
2020s crimes in Kabul
21st-century mass murder in Afghanistan
Attacks on buildings and structures in 2023
Attacks on buildings and structures in Kabul
Improvised explosive device bombings in 2023
ISIL terrorist incidents in Afghanistan
Islamic terrorist incidents in 2023
January 2023 crimes in Asia
January 2023 events in Afghanistan
Mass murder in 2023
Terrorist attacks on airports in Asia
Terrorist incidents in Afghanistan in 2023